Logan is a school and small unincorporated community in southeastern Greene County, Missouri, United States. The community is centered on the school and includes several homes and the Logan Cemetery.

The school and community was named for a local family.

References

Unincorporated communities in Greene County, Missouri
Springfield metropolitan area, Missouri
Unincorporated communities in Missouri